The 2015 VCU Rams baseball team was the program's 45th season fielding a varsity baseball program, and their third season the Atlantic 10 Conference.

Led by Shawn Stiffler for his third season, the Rams had their most successful baseball season in program history. The Rams advanced to the NCAA Super Regional for the first time ever, and won their first ever Atlantic 10 Conference baseball tournament. It was the program's return to the NCAA tournament for the first time since 2010.

Personnel

2015 roster

Schedule

Rankings

References 

Vcu
VCU Rams baseball seasons
VCU Rams baseball
VCU
Vcu baseball